Kevin Carey Joyce is a former Democratic member of the Illinois House of Representatives who represented the 35th District from 2003 until 2010.

Born in Chicago, Illinois, Joyce attended John Carroll University. His father, Jeremiah E. Joyce, also served in the Illinois General Assembly. In 2010, Joyce accepted a fundraising position with Ave Maria University, a private Roman Catholic university near Naples, Florida. He was succeeded in the Illinois House of Representatives by John O'Sullivan, the Democratic Committeeman from Worth Township. As of 2014, Joyce served as vice president of development at the university.

Head coaching record

References

External links
Illinois General Assembly - Representative Kevin Joyce (D) 35th District official IL House website
Bills Committees
Project Vote Smart - Representative Kevin Joyce (IL) profile
Follow the Money - Kevin Carey Joyce
2006 2004 2002 campaign contributions
Illinois House Democrats - Kevin Joyce profile

Year of birth missing (living people)
Living people
21st-century American politicians
Ave Maria Gyrenes athletic directors
Ave Maria Gyrenes football coaches
Coaches of American football from Illinois
John Carroll University alumni
Democratic Party members of the Illinois House of Representatives
Politicians from Chicago